The  Oakland Raiders season was the franchise's 31st season in the National Football League (NFL), the 41st overall, their sixth season of their second stint in Oakland, and the third season under head coach Jon Gruden. The Raiders finished the season 12–4 (the best record in the Gruden era), winning the AFC West for the first time since 1990. They returned to the playoffs for the first time since 1993, when the team was still in Los Angeles. The Divisional Round playoff game versus the Miami Dolphins would be their first home playoff game in Oakland since defeating the Houston Oilers in the 1980 AFC Wild Card Playoffs.

This was the first of three consecutive AFC West titles for the Raiders. As the No. 2 seed in the AFC, the Raiders received a bye into the divisional round of the playoffs. Their four regular season losses were by a combined 16 points. The Raiders held the Miami Dolphins scoreless, winning 27–0. The following week against the eventual Super Bowl champion Baltimore Ravens in the AFC Championship, starting quarterback Rich Gannon sustained a shoulder injury after being hit by Baltimore's Tony Siragusa early in the second quarter. The loss of Gannon was too steep to overcome as the Raiders lost 16–3. Siragusa was later fined $10,000 for the hit. This was the NFL-record 9th playoff loss in Raiders history with a Super Bowl berth at stake (since tied by the San Francisco 49ers in 2013). The Raiders set a still-standing franchise record for most points scored in the regular season, with 479.

Offseason

NFL Draft

Staff

Roster

Rookies in italics

Regular season

Schedule

Season summary

Week 1

Week 8

Standings

Playoffs

AFC Divisional Playoff Game

AFC Championship Game

Awards and records
 Led NFL, Net Yards Gained, Rushing (2,470 yards) 
 Led NFL, First Downs, Rushing (128 First Downs) 
 Led NFL, Rushing Offense 
 Eric Allen, AFC Defensive Player of the Month, December 
 Rich Gannon, Bert Bell Award
 Rich Gannon, All-Pro selection
 Rich Gannon, AFC Pro Bowl Selection
Rich Gannon, PFW/PFWA All-Pro Team 
 Rich Gannon, Pro Bowl MVP Award 
 Shane Lechler, Single Season Record, Highest Punting Average in One Season, 45.9 Yards
Shane Lechler, All-NFL Team (as selected by the Associated Press, Pro Football Weekly, and the Pro Football Writers of America) 
Shane Lechler, PFW/PFWA All-Rookie Team (as selected by the Associated Press, Pro Football Weekly, and the Pro Football Writers of America)

Pro Bowl selections
Rich Gannon, AFC Pro Bowl Selection,
Lincoln Kennedy, AFC Pro Bowl Selection,
Steve Wisniewski, AFC Pro Bowl Selection,
Charles Woodson, AFC Pro Bowl Selection,

Team leaders
 Scoring – Sebastian Janikowski, 112 Points
 Rushing – Tyrone Wheatley, 1,046 Yards
 Passing – Rich Gannon, 3,430 Yards
 Receiving – Tim Brown, 1,128 Yards
 Receptions – Tim Brown, 76
 Interceptions – Eric Allen, William Thomas, 6 each
 Sacks – Grady Jackson,8.0

References

External links
 Raiders on Pro Football Reference
 Raiders on jt-sw.com

Oakland Raiders seasons
Oakland
AFC West championship seasons
Raiders
Oakland